The 2021 Emperor's Cup (Emperor's Cup JFA 101st Japan Football Championship (Japanese: 天皇杯 JFA 第101回全日本サッカー選手権大会)) was the 101st annual Japanese national football cup tournament, which began on 22 May 2021 and ended with the final on 19 December that year.

Following the compressed format of the 2020 tournament, the 2021 Emperor's Cup was restored to its usual format, featuring 90 teams representing prefectural football associations as well as the J1 and J2 Leagues. Verspah Oita was also awarded a seeded entry as the JFA's annually designated amateur club.

Kawasaki Frontale were the defending champions. They were eliminated by Oita Trinita in the semi-finals. Urawa Red Diamonds won their eighth title and qualified for the 2022 AFC Champions League group stage.

Calendar
The schedule was announced on 2 April 2021.

Participating clubs
There are 90 clubs compete in the tournament. The representatives for the prefectures of Tottori and Kumamoto had to be determined by the local FAs after COVID-19 countermeasures made it impossible to continue the prefectural qualification tournaments.

Note

Bracket
Source:Tournament table (Official website in Japanese)

First round
The match between Tochigi City and the representatives of Yamanashi Prefecture, originally intended to be Yamanashi Gakuin University Pegasus and scheduled for 22 May, was postponed the day before by the Japan Football Association after Pegasus fielded an ineligible cup-tied player in the Yamanashi Prefecture Cup final. Note that Pegasus operates functionally as YGU's second team and competed in the Yamanashi tournament alongside the YGU third team, known as Orions; the first team YGU Braves also competed in Emperor's Cup qualifiers in Tokyo Metropolis. Subsequent to an investigation, the JFA decided on 24 May that YGU Pegasus would be disqualified and awarded their spot to Nirasaki Astros, their opponents in the Yamanashi final.

Also postponed was the match between Tonan Maebashi and Juntendo University after an individual affiliated with Juntendo tested positive for COVID-19. The match was eventually rescheduled for 5 June.

Second round

Third round
The third round schedule was announced on 17 June 2021.

Round of 16

Quarter-finals
A draw was held on 24 September 2021 to determine the matchups of the quarter-final stage and onwards. Nagoya Grampus was guaranteed to have home advantage in quarter-finals as they advanced to the quarter-finals of the 2021 AFC Champions League, while Urawa Red Diamonds, Kashima Antlers and Oita Trinita were drawn as the away team in quarter-finals as they could not guarantee their home stadium at the moment.

Semi-finals

Final

See also
League
2021 J1 League
2021 J2 League
2021 J3 League
2021 Japan Football League
Cup(s)
2021 Fuji Xerox Super Cup
2021 J.League YBC Levain Cup

References

External links
Emperors Cup 2021, JFA.jp

Emperor's Cup
Japan
2021 in Japanese football